Howard Kramer "Howdy" Gray (August 28, 1901 – September 6, 1955) was a college football player and surgeon.

Princeton
Gray was a prominent end on the Princeton Tigers football team.

1922
On the national champion "Team of Destiny" in its game against Chicago, Howdy picked up a fumble and ran it 40 yards for the touchdown. Gray's father, the president of the Union Pacific Railroad, wildly waved his program and hit a woman in the shoulder. "Hey, that's my wife," a man shouted at him. "Sorry," the excited father said, "but that was my boy who scored." "Oh," the husband said. "Hit her again." Various selectors picked Gray for All-American.

An impostor claiming to be the 1922 All-American end from Princeton surnamed Gray managed to get signed to the St. Louis All-Stars of the National Football League. The impostor, who misquoted Gray's first name as Jack "Dolly" Gray, was then pawned off onto the Green Bay Packers after it became clear he was not the Princeton end.

References

External links

1901 births
1955 deaths
All-American college football players
American football ends
Princeton Tigers football players
American surgeons
Identity theft victims
20th-century surgeons